Charles Joseph Wells Butler (10 October 1897 – September 1963), sometimes known as Joe Butler, was an English professional footballer who played as a full back. After a brief spell with Manchester United in which he failed to break into the first-team, he played for Brentford and Gillingham between 1923 and 1928.

Career statistics

References

1897 births
English footballers
Gillingham F.C. players
Manchester United F.C. players
Brentford F.C. players
Sportspeople from Watford
North American Soccer Football League players
Montreal Carsteel players
Grays Thurrock United F.C. players
Ton Pentre F.C. players
England youth international footballers
English expatriate footballers
English expatriate sportspeople in Canada
Expatriate soccer players in Canada
Canadian National Soccer League players
1963 deaths
Association football fullbacks